Christensenia is a genus of weevils in the family Curculionidae.

External links 

Entiminae